St Saviour is a parish of Jersey in the Channel Islands. It is located directly east of St Helier. It has a population of 13,580. It has a land surface area of 3.6 square miles (9.3 km2) and has a very small coastline at Le Dicq.

The parish is quite urbanised, hosting the suburbs and exurbs for the town of St Helier. The most notable settlement is located around the Five Oaks area in the centre of the parish and Georgetown in the South. The village of Maufant is located on the boundary with St Martin.

History 
The parish's name derives from Jesus Christ as the Redeemer (Sanctus Salvator). The parish church's full dedication is to St Saviour of the Thorn.

The parish crest displays a thorn with three nails, to represent the Saviour's suffering. Government House is the official residence of the Lieutenant-Governor, the Queen's representative in Jersey. It was originally known as Belmont and was acquired in 1821. It was originally constructed in 1814.

The church and parish hall are located half way along the road known as St Saviour's Hill. In the 19th Century the road was opened on its current route. Before then, the road ran through the current grounds of Government House. There was formerly an inn in what is now part of the cemetery of the church.

Governance

The parish is a first-level administrative division of the Bailiwick of Jersey, a British Crown dependency. The incumbent office holder is Sadie Le Sueur-Rennard, who has held the office since 2011. The parish administration is headquartered at the Parish Hall, next to the parish church.

At present, the parish forms three electoral districts for States Assembly elections and elects five Deputies, as well as eight Senators in an islandwide constituency. The current Deputies for St Saviour are listed below. Under the proposed electoral reform, St Saviour will form a single constituency, electing five representatives alongside its .

Geography 

St Saviour is in the east of the island of Jersey. It borders Trinity, St Martin, Grouville, St Clement and St Helier. The south of the parish is a highly urbanised part of town, focused around Georgetown and Five Oaks. The area in the south is known as Georgetown, Plat Douet and Longueville. It is near Howard Davis Park and has a short piece of coastline, the only one in the parish. It is also home to the Rue des Près Trading Estate. The Five Oaks area is home to many schools and suburban housing for St Helier. The remainder of the parish is largely rural, save for a few small developments such as Maufant Village (split between St Saviour and St Martin) and the houses near Queen's Valley Reservoir. The Grands Vaux reservoir runs along the border of St Saviour and St Helier.

In terms of transport, the parish has many main roads that run through the parish to connect to other parishes, such as La Grande Route de St Martin and Longueville Road. Part of the St Helier Ring Road is located within St Saviour. The parish does not have any green lanes. The parish's Connétable Sadie Le Sueur-Rennard said 'I can't see where we would have a green lane', although the parish has a large number of lanes (including lanes that border green lanes in St Martin).

St Saviour is twinned with Villedieu-les-Poêles, Normandy.

Demography
St  Saviour is Jersey's second most populated parish, with 13,580 residents in 2011.

Religious sites 
The parish church existed at least as early as 1087, however each was originally four separate chapels, dedicated to Jesus, St John, St Martin and Mary, mother of Jesus. Before 1145, connecting walls were built to create the parish church. The central tower was built in the 14th century. The parish Rector is uniquely known as 'Rector and Vicar' or 'Perpetual Curate'. The church has four bells, the oldest dating to 1656, the other three dating to 1968. Within its precincts, when plague was raging in 1563, the Royal Court of Jersey found a refuge, by permission granted of Hugh Perrin, on whose fief the building stood. Extensive repairs took place on the church in the late 19th and early 20th centuries. It is the best known of the Jersey churches outside the island because of the link to Lillie Langtry, whose father was the church Rector. She is buried in the churchyard, which is the largest of any of the island's parish churches, owing to the generosity of the Connétable in 1844.

Elsewhere in the parish is the Anglican church of St Luke's near Howard Davis Park. It is one of only three in the island to celebrate in the tradition of the Anglican High Church. Due to population growth after the Napoleonic Wars, a new ecclesiastical district was created for Havre des Pas, with the new church completed in 1851. In the park next to the church, there is a War Cemetery dedicated to the servicemen who lost their lives off Guernsey in HMS Charybidis and HMS Limborune.

Landmarks

 Government House
Grainville Cricket Ground
St Saviour's Church
Howard Davis Park
Rue des Près Trading Estate
Highalnds College Turner Building
College House (Jersey College for Girls)
Longueville Manor

Education
The parish is home to a very large number of schools. Many of the schools have an island-wide student body, and therefore during school pick-up and drop-off times the roads in the parish can become very congested.
Private schools:
De La Salle College
De La Sallle Primary School
FCJ Primary School
St Michael's Preparatory School
States schools (fee-paying):
Jersey College for Girls
Jersey College Preparatory School
States schools (all-island)
Highlands College - the island's further education college
Hautlieu School - a grammar school (Year 10–11) and Sixth Form
D'Hautree School
States schools (catchment)
Grainville School 
Plat Douet School
St Luke's School
St Saviour's School

Notable people 

 Lillie Langtry (1853–1929), British-American socialite, actress and producer from St  Saviour
 Agnes Harben (1879–1961), British suffragist
 The Misses Corbett, Grace (–1843) and Walterina (died 1837), Scottish poets and authors

Gallery

References

External links

St Saûveux

 
Parishes of Jersey